Snakeboy is the second album by Killdozer, released on September 29, 1985 through Touch and Go Records. The album deals with many personalities and figures but is mostly about the lead singer's encounter with a man Bill Reisman Fan favorites such as "King of Sex" and the cover version of Neil Young's "Cinnamon Girl" make their appearance on this release. The CD release of this album is coupled with Intellectuals Are the Shoeshine Boys of the Ruling Elite, appearing on the latter half.

Track listing

Personnel
Killdozer
Michael Gerald – vocals, bass guitar, percussion
Bill Hobson – guitar, harmonica, percussion, backing vocals
Dan Hobson – drums, backing vocals
Production and additional personnel
Cyndee Baudhuin – photography
Robin Davies – percussion on "Going to the Beach"
Duke Erikson – mixing, recording
Killdozer – mixing, recording
The Love of Mike Orchestra, The – backing vocals on "King of Sex"
Steve Marker – production
Jessica Noll – violin on "River"
Butch Vig – mixing, recording, percussion on "Big Song of Love"

References

External links 
 

1985 albums
Killdozer (band) albums
Touch and Go Records albums